Route knowledge is one of the core skills together with train handling (also known as brake handling) and a full understanding of railway rules, which the operating crew must possess in order to be able to operate a train safely.

Content

The information that must be learnt and understood includes the following:

Route characteristics
 Route features: stations, depots, yards, sidings, junctions, points, crossings, signal boxes, bridges, tunnels, names of running lines, direction of travel of running lines, gradients in relation to the types of train to be driven and termination/limiting points of movements.
 Signal types: the signalling system(s) in use, including the position, sighting and function of signals and associated route indicators.
 Train protection systems: commencement and termination points of the infrastructure elements of systems.
 Train radio systems: commencement and termination points of the infrastructure elements of train radio systems. Where relevant to the operation, this should include the location of channel change locations.
 Lineside signage: location and meaning of all lineside signs applicable to the safe operation of trains, for example fire zones, power shut-off boards, etc.
 Permitted speed: permitted  train and line speed restrictions for all normal and degraded conditions.
 Level crossings: the location of level crossings, including open crossings and those equipped with automatic half-barriers and miniature red/green lights. Relevant speed restrictions for level crossings, including any special working arrangements for degraded situations.
 Braking points and stopping distances: braking points and stopping distances in relation to characteristics of the route and the types of train to be driven.
 Stations: train stopping points, platform lengths, methods of train despatch and operating restrictions.
 Power supplies: as applicable, knowledge of neutral sections/section gaps, wired/unwired sections of route, track paralleling huts, isolation procedures.
 Communication: systems in operation and relevant contact numbers for signallers/dispatchers, Zone Controls, and Emergency Control Centres etc.
 Operating restrictions: for example, use of signal post telephones, restrictions on route availability.
 Local working instructions for locations where non-standard procedures are in place.
 Authorised walking routes: knowledge applicable to all locations where crew must walk close to train movements.

Where there is a risk that a signal may be "passed at danger" 

 Signals which have been passed at danger on several occasions, with a particular focus on those where the potential consequences are significant.
 Signal gantries where there is history of a signal passed at danger or there is a potential to misread signals (reading across).
 Signals that can be viewed in advance of the next signal (reading through), this is a particular risk with modern ultra-bright LED signals.
 Signals that are known to sometimes be affected by bright sunlight (both main and shunting signals).
 Signals which are positioned on the opposite side of the running line in the direction of travel (both main and shunting signals).
 Locations where there are inconsistent braking distances between signals.
 Locations where the signalling changes between 4 aspect, 3 aspect and 2 aspect color light.
 Locations or routes where there is a mixture of color light and mechanical signalling.
 Commencement and termination points of bi-directional working.
 Locations where the signal is not in view where there is a potential for starting against the signal at danger (SAS SPAD or SASPAD in the UK).
 Locations where the normal stopping point is adjacent to the signal and there is a potential for starting against the signal at danger.
 Locations where starting on a caution signal has led to a driver/engineer inadvertently passing the next signal at danger (SOYSPAD in the UK).
 Potential distractions such as passing through an electrical neutral section on the approach to a signal.
 Locations or routes not fitted with Train protection systems, including termination, commencement points and gaps.

Other route risks

 Exceptional low adhesion areas, low adhesion areas and other locations which are affected by seasonal factors (e.g., leaves) or climatic factors (e.g., ice).
 Potential differences between driving over the route in daylight and in darkness.
 Platform, tunnel, or street lighting which may affect the identification of braking points.
 Potential lineside distractions such as depots, yards and non-railway activities (e.g., outdoor swimming pools).
 Bi-directional working, reversible working or multi-track lines that do not run parallel to each other.
 Locations where there is a significant reduction in line speed.
 Communication black spots.
 Complex signalling or track layout. For example, the approaches to major junctions and stations.

Methods and assessment
Route learning can consist of:
Studying route maps and diagrams, such as the Network Rail Sectional Appendix
Travelling in the cab of a train with a driver
Driving a train over the route with an instructor
Watching route videos

References

Rail transport operations